Instrumentality may refer to:

Philosophy
 Instrumentality (theology), a theory that falls under the broader category of the prophetic model of biblical inspiration
 The theory of Instrumentalism in the philosophy of science
 The philosophical concept of Instrumental rationality

Literature and entertainment
 Instrumentality of Mankind, refers to both the fictional world and the central government in many of the stories written by Cordwainer Smith (1939–1966)
 The Human Instrumentality Project from the Neon Genesis Evangelion anime series
 Instrumentality (album) (2006), from Luther Wright and the Wrongs